Avant is an incorporated community in eastern Osage County, Oklahoma, United States. The population was 320 at the 2010 census, a decline of 14.0 percent from the figure of 372 recorded in 2000.

History
Ben Avant, a native of Gonzales, Texas, married Rosalie Rogers, a Cherokee-Osage, and established a ranch in 1896. The Avant oil field was discovered in 1904. The Midland Valley Railroad (later acquired by the Missouri Pacific Railroad) reached the Avant ranch in 1905. A post office named Avant was established in 1906, but the town did not really begin to develop until 1909. Avant's population peaked at 1,071 in 1920, but declined steadily thereafter. Ben Avant was shot and killed by the town marshal in 1923.

The post office in Avant was slated for possible closure by the US Postal service in 2012, but the postal service website still shows the Avant post office is open as of July, 2020.

Geography
Avant is located at  (36.488660, -96.061403). Avant lies along Bird Creek. Birch Lake is to the west-northwest, while Skiatook Lake is to the southwest.  

Transportation
Avant is just off the current Oklahoma State Highway 11, along a prior alignment of the road now known as Old Highway 11.  

The Candy Lake Estate Airport (Airport Identifier—98OK) is directly to the east of town.

Demographics

As of the census of 2010, there were 320 people living in the town. The population density was 1,050.9 people per square mile (410.4/km2). The racial makeup of the town was 70.43% White, 0.27% African American, 13.71% Native American, 0.27% Asian, 0.54% from other races, and 14.78% from two or more races. Hispanic or Latino of any race were 3.49% of the population.

There were  households, out of which 35.7% had children under the age of 18 living with them, 53.1% were married couples living together, 8.4% had a female householder with no husband present, and 30.1% were non-families. 27.3% of all households were made up of individuals, and 9.8% had someone living alone who was 65 years of age or older. The average household size was 2.60 and the average family size was 3.18.

In the town, the population was spread out, with 29.3% under the age of 18, 10.8% from 18 to 24, 26.1% from 25 to 44, 23.1% from 45 to 64, and 10.8% who were 65 years of age or older. The median age was 35 years. For every 100 females, there were 111.4 males. For every 100 females age 18 and over, there were 113.8 males.

The median income for a household in the town was $31,979, and the median income for a family was $40,313. Males had a median income of $32,500 versus $16,250 for females. The per capita income for the town was $12,995. About 15.9% of families and 23.8% of the population were below the poverty line, including 38.7% of those under age 18 and 10.0% of those age 65 or over.

Economy
The local economy has been supported by agriculture and oil production.

References

External links
 Encyclopedia of Oklahoma History and Culture - Avant
Wolverine Oil Company's Drayage Barn near Avant, on the NRHP list

Towns in Osage County, Oklahoma
Towns in Oklahoma
Populated places established in 1906
1906 establishments in Oklahoma Territory